Mikael Eriksson is a Swedish footballer currently playing for Jönköpings Södra IF in the Swedish Superettan. He has previously played for Degerfors IF.

In mid-2007, there was speculation in the Australian media that Eriksson was the target of Sydney FC manager Branko Culina, but nothing came of it.

References

Swedish footballers
Living people
Jönköpings Södra IF players
Degerfors IF players
1978 births
Association football midfielders